Jean Capelle (16 March 1909 – 29 May 1983) was a French politician and advocate of Living Latin.

References

1909 births
1983 deaths
French politicians